The Long, later Tylney-Long Baronetcy, of Westminster in the County of London, was a title in the Baronetage of England. It was created in 1662 for Robert Long.

History 
The baronetcy was created for Robert Long, Member of Parliament from 1624 to 1627 and in the Short Parliament and again from 1661 to 1673 on 1 September 1662. Long never married and, lacking male descendants, was succeeded by his nephew James, the second Baronet. James was the son of Sir Walter Long. Three of Sir James's grandsons, the third, fourth and fifth Baronets, all succeeded in the title.

Sir James Long, the 5th Baronet, represented several constituencies in the House of Commons. He married Lady Emma, daughter of Richard Tylney, 1st Earl Tylney (see Earl Tylney). Their son, the sixth Baronet, succeeded to the substantial Tylney estates, including Wanstead, on the death of his maternal uncle in 1784 and assumed the additional surname of Tylney. His only son, also James, the eighth Baronet, died young in 1805 and the baronetcy became extinct.

Catherine Tylney-Long, daughter of the seventh Baronet and sister of the eighth and last Baronet, inherited the family estates. She married William Pole-Wellesley, 4th Earl of Mornington, who assumed the additional surnames of Tylney and Long. See Earl of Mornington for further history of this title.

Long, later Tylney-Long baronets, of Westminster (1662)
Sir Robert Long, 1st Baronet (1598–1673)
Sir James Long, 2nd Baronet (1617–1692)
Sir Robert Long, 3rd Baronet (1673–1692)
Sir Giles Long, 4th Baronet (1675–1698)
Sir James Long, 5th Baronet (1682–1729)
Sir Robert Long, 6th Baronet (1705–1767)
Sir James Tylney-Long, 7th Baronet (1736–1794)
Sir James Tylney-Long, 8th Baronet (1794–1805)

See also
Earl Tylney
Earl of Mornington

References

Extinct baronetcies in the Baronetage of England
Baronetcies created with special remainders